The list of DFB-Pokal winning managers contains all the managers who have led their respective team to success in the DFB-Pokal. The DFB-Pokal has been played since 1952, although the Tschammerpokal, its predecessor, took place from 1935 to 1943. Since then, 54 coaches have won a cup victory. Of these, 40 are German, 4 Yugoslav, 3 Austrian and Dutch, and an Italian, Hungarian, Spaniard and Croatian.

Six coaches have won the trophy three times. Hennes Weisweiler was the first to do so in 1978. The other three-time winners are Karl-Heinz Feldkamp (with three different teams), Ottmar Hitzfeld, Udo Lattek, Otto Rehhagel, and Thomas Schaaf. The most successful foreign coaches are Zlatko Čajkovski, Pep Guardiola and Huub Stevens, with two titles. Richard Michalke won the first cup competition in 1935 with 1. FC Nürnberg. The Austrian Leopold Nitsch won in 1938, making him the first foreign manager to win. In 1941, Georg Köhler became the first manager to successfully defend the title. In 2005, Felix Magath became the first coach to complete consecutive league and cup doubles. Hans Meyer is the only manager to win both the DFB-Pokal and the FDGB-Pokal, the cup competition of East Germany.

A total of six people have won the cup as both player and manager. Ludwig Janda won as a player in 1942 with 1860 Munich and as a manager in 1956 with Karlsruher SC. Alfred Schmidt also did so while playing for Borussia Dortmund in 1965 and managing Kickers Offenbach in 1970. Thomas Schaaf won the DFB-Pokal with the same club, after winning as a player for Werder Bremen in 1991 and 1994, and as manager in 1999, 2004, and 2009. He is also the only person to have won the cup as both player and manager with multiple titles during his playing career. Jupp Heynckes won as a player with Borussia Mönchengladbach in 1973 and as a manager with Bayern Munich in 2013. Niko Kovač won in 2003 as a player with Bayern and in 2018 and 2019 as manager of Eintracht Frankfurt and Bayern Munich, respectively. Hansi Flick is the most recent manager to have achieved the feat, winning in 1986 as a player and in 2020 as a manager, both with Bayern Munich. Schaaf, Kovač and Flick are the only managers to have won titles as a player and manager with the same club, having done so for Werder Bremen, Bayern Munich and Bayern Munich, respectively. Schaaf and Kovač are also the only people to have won the cup as both player and manager with multiple titles during their managerial career.

Winning managers

Tschammerpokal

DFB-Pokal

Ranking

By individual

By nationality

See also
 DFB-Pokal
 List of Bundesliga managers

Notes

References

Winning managers
DFB-Pokal winning managers